Rajiv Gandhi National Sadbhavana Award (English: Rajiv Gandhi National Communal Harmony Award) is an Indian award given for outstanding contribution towards promotion of communal harmony, national integration and peace. The award was instituted by All India Congress Committee of the Indian National Congress Party (INC), in 1992 to commemorate the lasting contribution made by the former Prime Minister Rajiv Gandhi, carries a citation and a cash award of Rs. ten lakhs. It is given on 20 August, the birth anniversary of Rajiv Gandhi, which is celebrated as Sadbhavna Diwas (Harmony Day).

Recipients

Former recipients of the award include Mother Teresa, Shenai maestro Ustad Bismillah Khan, Grameen Bank founder Muhammad Yunus of Bangladesh, Former Assam Chief Minister Hiteswar Saikia  and freedom fighter Subhadra Joshi (jointly), Lata Mangeshkar, Sunil Dutt, Jagan Nath Kaul, Dilip Kumar and author Kapila Vatsyayan, Wahiuddin Khan(Islamic scholar), Kiran Seth(founder of SPIC MACAY) (2011). Other recipients are civil society activists Teesta Setalvad and Harsh Mander (jointly), S N Subbarao, Swami Agnivesh and Madari Moideen (jointly), former President K R Narayanan, Nirmala Deshpande, Hem Dutta (2007), N Radhakrishnan and Gautam Bhai.

See also
 Rajiv Gandhi Khel Ratna
 Indira Gandhi Award for National Integration

References

External links
 Official All India Congress Committee website
 Official Indian National Congress website

Indian National Congress
Indian awards
Awards established in 1992
1992 establishments in India
Memorials to Rajiv Gandhi